Emad Avar (also Romanized as ‘Emād Āvar; also known as ‘Emād Āvard, Emād Āvard, and Aḩmad-e Vard) is a village in Azimiyeh Rural District, in the Central District of Ray County, Tehran Province, Iran. At the 2006 census, its population was 842, in 220 families.

References 

Populated places in Ray County, Iran